Beagle Bay can refer to:

Places
 Beagle Bay, New South Wales, a coastal location at South Durras, New South Wales
 Beagle Bay Community, Western Australia (formerly Beagle Bay Mission)
 Beagle Bay (Western Australia), a bay in Western Australia on the south-western coast of the Dampier Peninsula

Sport
 Beagle Bay (Peninsular) Bombers, an Australian rules football club